The 2022 ToyotaCare 250 was the seventh stock car race of the 2022 NASCAR Xfinity Series, the 35th iteration of the event, and the first race of the Dash 4 Cash. The race was held on Saturday, April 2, 2022, in Henrico County, Virginia at Richmond Raceway, a 0.75 mile (1.21 km) permanent D-shaped oval. The Dash 4 Cash in this race consisted of A. J. Allmendinger, Austin Hill, Noah Gragson, and Sam Mayer, after they finished in the top 5 at Circuit of the Americas. The race was run over 250 laps. Ty Gibbs of Joe Gibbs Racing would win the race after passing his teammate, John Hunter Nemechek, on the last lap. This was Gibbs' seventh career Xfinity Series win, and his third of the season. To fill out the podium, Nemechek of Joe Gibbs Racing and Sam Mayer of JR Motorsports would finish 2nd and 3rd, respectively. Mayer would win the Dash 4 Cash after finishing ahead of Allmendinger, Hill, and Gragson.

Background 
Richmond Raceway (RR) is a 0.75 miles (1.21 km), D-shaped, asphalt race track located just outside Richmond, Virginia in unincorporated Henrico County. It hosts the NASCAR Cup Series, NASCAR Xfinity Series and the NASCAR Camping World Truck Series. Known as "America's premier short track", it has formerly hosted events such as the International Race of Champions, Denny Hamlin Short Track Showdown, and the USAC sprint car series. Due to Richmond Raceway's unique "D" shape which allows drivers to reach high speeds, Richmond has long been known as a short track that races like a superspeedway. With its multiple racing grooves, and proclivity for contact Richmond is a favorite among NASCAR drivers and fans.

Entry list 

 (R) denotes rookie driver.
 (i) denotes driver who is ineligible for series driver points.

Practice 
The only 30-minute practice session was held on Saturday, April 2, at 8:30 AM EST.

Qualifying 
Qualifying was held on Saturday, April 2, at 9:00 AM EST. Since Richmond Raceway is a short track, the qualifying system used is a single-car, two-lap system with only one round. Whoever sets the fastest time in the round wins the pole.

Full qualifying results

Race results 
Stage 1 Laps: 75

Stage 2 Laps: 75

Stage 3 Laps: 100

Standings after the race 

Drivers' Championship standings

Note: Only the first 12 positions are included for the driver standings.

References 

2022 NASCAR Xfinity Series
NASCAR races at Richmond Raceway
ToyotaCare 250
ToyotaCare 250